is a mountain located in Yamanouchi, Nagano, Japan. For the 1998 Winter Olympics, it hosted the alpine skiing slalom and snowboarding giant slalom events.

During the 1998 games, the mountain suffered a mild earthquake that registered 5.0 on the Richter magnitude scale, but the skiing events continued.

References
 1998 Winter Olympics official report. Volume 2. pp. 194–7.
 "Poor skiing conditions nothing new to Whistler". 14 February 2010 Toronto Observer article accessed 20 September 2010.
 Shinmai.co.jp 1998 Winter Olympics venue profile.

Venues of the 1998 Winter Olympics
Olympic alpine skiing venues
Olympic snowboarding venues
Yakebitai